Miss Belize is a national beauty pageant in Belize. The pageant was founded in 1975,  where the winners were sent to Miss Universe.

History
In the early days of the pageant there was one pageant held yearly to select a Belizean representative for the Miss Universe pageant, with either the same winner or a runner-up representing Belize at Miss World. Recently there have been the emergence of different pageants to select representatives for the different international pageants as opposed to just one pageant with several winners.

Opal Enriquez won a pageant in Los Angeles, but never was an official Miss Belize winner of any pageant held in Belize. Nonetheless she did well in her pageant under her US Director Eva Gallego and went on to become Miss Costa Maya 1st. Runner-up when Andrea Elrington withdrew. Enriquez has gone on to produce her own winner at Costa Maya in 2013 and giving Belize its third Miss Costa Maya pageant International winner.
 
2008 elected Miss Belize Universe Tanisha Vernon spoke out "against Pageants Belize, owner, and only employee – Margaret Johnson". Her crown was then revoked in July 2008.

In 2016, Opal Enriquez took over the Miss Universe franchise. In 2016 Miss Belize will compete at the Miss Universe after 8 years of not existing, while the first runner-up goes to Miss International.

In 2018, Romeo Escobar, a three Emmy award-winning producer took over the franchise of Miss Universe in Belize.

Titleholders
The following is a list of winners. From 1975 to Present. The Queen of the Jewel acquired the naming rights and the competition between 2010 and 2016.The pageant has not been held in 1992, 1994, 2002, 2009, 2011, 2013-2015 and 2017.

Titleholders under Miss Belize org.

Miss Universe Belize

The Miss Belize Organization is the only one organization that licensed Miss Universe pageant in Belize since 1975. The winner is always competing at Miss Universe pageant. On occasion, when the winner does not qualify (due to age) for either contest, a runner-up is sent.

References

External links
 

 

Beauty pageants in Belize
1975 establishments in Belize
Belizean awards
Belize